The nine provinces of South Africa are governed by provincial governments which form the second layer of government, between the national government and the municipalities. The provincial governments are established, and their structure defined, by Chapter Six of the Constitution of South Africa.

The provincial governments are structured according to a parliamentary system in which the executive is dependent on and accountable to the legislature. In each province the provincial legislature is directly elected by proportional representation, and the legislature in turn elects one of its members as Premier to head the executive. The Premier appoints an Executive Council (a cabinet), consisting of members of the legislature, to administer the various departments of the provincial administration.

The powers of the provincial governments are circumscribed by the national constitution, which limits them to certain listed "functional areas". In some areas the provincial governments' powers are concurrent with those of the national government, while in other areas the provincial governments have exclusive powers. The constitution prescribes a principle of "co-operative government" whereby the various layers of government must co-ordinate their actions and legislation; it also lays down a series of rules for resolving conflicts between national and provincial legislation.

Legislature

Each province has a unicameral provincial legislature, varying in size from 30 to 80 members depending on the population of the province. The members of the provincial legislature are elected by party-list proportional representation for a usual term of five years, although under certain circumstances the legislature may be dissolved before its term expires. By convention elections to the provincial legislatures are held on the same day as elections to the National Assembly; the most recent such election was held on 8 May 2019. At that election the African National Congress (ANC) won a majority in eight of the provinces, while the Democratic Alliance (DA) won a majority in the Western Cape.

Executive

The head of the provincial executive is the Premier, who is elected by the provincial legislature from amongst its members; frequently the Premier will be the provincial leader of the majority party. The term of office of the Premier is the same as that of the legislature (normally five years) with a term limit of two terms. The legislature can force the resignation of the Premier by a motion of no confidence. If the Premiership is vacant and the legislature fails to elect a new Premier within 30 days, the legislature is dissolved and an election is called.

 the nine Premiers are:
 Premier of the Eastern Cape: Oscar Mabuyane (ANC)
 Premier of the Free State: Mxolisi Dukwana (ANC)
 Premier of Gauteng: Panyaza Lesufi (ANC)
 Premier of KwaZulu-Natal: Nomusa Dube-Ncube (ANC)
 Premier of Limpopo: Stanley Mathabatha (ANC)
 Premier of Mpumalanga: Refilwe Mtsweni-Tsipane (ANC)
 Premier of North West: Job Mokgoro (ANC)
 Premier of the Northern Cape: Zamani Saul (ANC)
 Premier of the Western Cape: Alan Winde (DA)

The Premier appoints an Executive Council (a cabinet) of five to ten members of the provincial legislature. The Members of the Executive Council (or MECs) are responsible for the various departments of the provincial administration. Because the responsibilities of the provincial governments are limited to those listed in the constitution, the portfolios are quite similar across the provinces. Common MEC portfolios and departmental responsibilities include:
 agriculture
 arts and culture
 economic development
 education
 environmental affairs
 finance
 health
 human settlements
 local government
 police or public safety
 public works
 roads and transport
 social development
 sport and recreation
 tourism
Several of these areas may be combined in one department and the portfolio of one MEC.

Judiciary

South Africa has a single national court system, and the administration of justice is the responsibility of the national government. At present the jurisdictional boundaries of the High Courts do not correspond entirely with the provincial boundaries; the Superior Courts Bill currently before Parliament will rationalise the courts so that there is a single High Court division in each province.

The provincial executive does play a role in the selection of High Court judges, as the Premier of a province is ex officio a member of the Judicial Service Commission when it deals with matters relating to a High Court that sits in that province.

Provincial constitutions
A provincial legislature can, by a two-thirds majority vote, adopt a constitution for the province; it is not necessary to do so, as the national constitution provides a complete structure for provincial government. A provincial constitution must be consistent with the national constitution except that it can provide for different structures and procedures for the executive and the legislature.

The only province that has adopted a constitution is the Western Cape; in doing so it chose to rename its legislature the Provincial Parliament. It also calls its Executive Council the Provincial Cabinet, and the MECs are called Provincial Ministers.

See also 

 Government of the Eastern Cape
 Government of Gauteng
 Government of the Northern Cape
 Government of the Western Cape

External links
 South African Government Online: Provincial government and departments
 Provincial Government Handbook of South Africa
 Eastern Cape provincial government
 Free State provincial government
 Gauteng provincial government
 KwaZulu-Natal provincial government
 Limpopo provincial government
 Mpumalanga provincial government
 Northern Cape provincial government
 North West provincial government
 Western Cape provincial government

 
Government of South Africa
Government
South Africa